The Local Electoral (Māori Wards and Māori Constituencies) Amendment Act is an Act of Parliament in New Zealand which eliminates mechanisms for holding public referendums on the establishment of Māori wards and constituencies on local bodies. The Act was supported by the Labour, Green and Māori parties but opposed by the opposition National and ACT parties. National attempted to delay the bill by mounting a twelve-hour-long filibuster challenging all of the Act's ten clauses.

Background
The existing Local Electoral Act 2001 allowed local referendums (or polls) to overturn the decision of an elected local or regional council to introduce a Māori ward. Just five percent support was needed for a local poll to be held. Polls were almost always demanded when councils agreed to introduce Māori wards and only a single poll, in Wairoa, confirmed the establishment of a Māori ward. Opponents of the polls, including Local Government New Zealand president Dave Cull and New Plymouth mayor Andrew Judd, had maintained that the existence of polls on Māori wards but not other representation arrangements was discriminatory and harmful to race relations. A legislative attempt to outlaw Māori ward polls in 2017 was unsuccessful.

In mid-2018, local councils' efforts to introduce Māori wards in Palmerston North, Western Bay of Plenty, Whakatāne, Manawatu, and Kaikōura had been defeated at local referendums. By November 2020, nine further councils had agreed to introduce Māori wards or constituencies in Gisborne, Kaipara, New Plymouth, Ruapehu, South Taranaki, Tauranga, Taupō, Whangārei and the Northland Region. In response to the council decisions, lobby groups Hobson's Pledge and Democracy Northland began organising poll demand petitions in some communities including Tauranga and Northland. While a valid petition was eventually received in Tauranga, it was ultimately invalidated by the law change.

In early December 2020, advocacy group ActionStation and Māori ward campaigners Toni Boynton and Danae Lee collected 10,000 signatures calling for Parliament to eliminate legislation allowing referendums on Māori wards on local and regional councils. A previous petition "to make the establishment of Māori wards on district councils follow the same legal framework as establishing other wards on district councils," which had been organised by Judd, was considered by parliament's justice committee between 2016 and 2019. However, the committee was divided between Labour and National members and could not agree how to proceed.

Legislation
The Local Electoral (Māori Wards and Māori Constituencies) Amendment Bill seeks to align the treatment of Māori wards and constituencies with the treatment of general wards and constituencies; eliminate all mechanisms for binding polls to be held on the establishment of Māori wards and polls; and provide local bodies with the opportunity to make decisions on Māori wards and constituencies prior to the local body elections scheduled for 2022.

To achieve these policy goals, the Local Electoral Amendment Bill repeals:
the provisions in the Local Electoral Act 2001 relating to polls on the establishment of Māori wards and Māori constituencies;
prohibits local councils from initiating binding polls on whether to establish Māori wards or Māori constituencies (while retaining the right of councils to initiate non-binding polls to gauge public sentiment); and
establishes a transition period ending on 21 May 2021 in which any local authorities may establish Māori wards or Māori constituencies for the 2022 local elections.

Legislative history

First reading
On 1 February 2021, Minister of Local Government Nanaia Mahuta announced that the New Zealand Government would be introducing legislation to uphold local councils' decisions to establish Māori wards. On 7 February, The New Zealand Herald reported that the Government would introduce the Local Electoral Amendment Bill under urgency on 9 February. In response, the opposition National Party leader Judith Collins confirmed that her party would oppose the new legislation, claiming that New Zealanders had not been properly consulted. 

The Bill passed its first reading at the New Zealand Parliament on 9 February by a margin of 77:41. The ruling Labour Party, allied Green Party and the opposition Māori Party voted in favour of the law while the National Party and the libertarian ACT Party opposed it. On 10 February, the Chairperson of Parliament's Māori Affairs Committee issued an invitation for public submissions on the Local Electoral Amendment Bill. Submissions were open for two days; despite the truncated submission period, 12,508 submissions were received.

Second and third readings
On 23 February 2021, the Local Government Amendment Bill passed its second reading by a margin of 77:43 along partisan lines. The Labour, Green, and  Māori parties supported the bill while the National and ACT parties opposed it. That same day, the Bill passed its third reading by a margin of 77:43 along party lines. The National Party staunchly opposed the bill, staging a 12-hour filibuster opposing the Bill's ten clauses and vowing to repeal the bill if elected at the 2023 New Zealand general election.

Assent
On 1 March 2021, the Local Electoral (Māori Wards and Māori Constituencies) Amendment Bill received royal assent and was implemented into law.

Implementation and outcome 
Through the transition period to 21 May 2021, 32 councils resolved to introduce Māori wards or Māori constituencies ahead of the 2022 local elections. This made for a total of 34 councils with Māori wards at the election, not including Tauranga City Council where elections were deferred until 2024. In October 2021, Napier City Council voted to introduce Māori wards from the 2025 local elections. Councils undertook representation reviews through 2021 and 2022 resulting in the creation of 66 positions for councillors to be elected from Māori wards or constituencies.

After nominations for the elections closed, Local Government New Zealand said the competition was higher in the Māori seats with an average 2.2 candidates per seat compared to the historical average of 2 candidates per seat.

References

External links

Statutes of New Zealand
2021 in New Zealand law
Local government in New Zealand
Māori politics